The men's 4 × 100 metre freestyle relay event at the 2001 World Aquatics Championships took place in Marine Messe in Fukuoka, Japan in July 2001.

Prior to this meet, the United States have never lost this race since the inception of the World Championships in 1973. The final of the relay was notable for Ian Thorpe's swimming the closing leg for Australia with his fastest-ever relay split of 47.87 s, for the 47.02 seconds final leg, the fastest relay leg in history by Pieter van den Hoogenband and for the disqualification after the race of the American team.

Results

Final

  (Michael Klim, Ashley Callus, Todd Pearson, Ian Thorpe) 3:14.10
 
  (Mark Veens, Johan Kenkhuis, Klaas-Erik Zwering, Pieter van den Hoogenband) 3:14.56 European Record

  (Stefan Herbst, Torsten Spanneberg, Lars Conrad, Sven Lodziewski) 3:17.52

4.  3:18.00

5.  3:19.37

6.  3:21.63

DQ  3:15.29 Disqualified for Nate Dusing replacing Gregory Busse without announcing the change at least one hour before the competition.

DQ

References

World Aquatics Championships
Swimming at the 2001 World Aquatics Championships